Sid-Ahmed Kheddis (born August 22, 1985 in Algiers) is an Algerian football player who is currently playing as a defender for NA Hussein Dey in the Algerian league.

Personal
Kheddis is the son of former Algerian international and NA Hussein Dey player Mohamed Khedis.

Honours
Algerian Ligue Professionnelle 1 :
 J.S.Kabylie 2007/2008
 M.C.Alger 2009/2010

External links
 DZFoot Profile

1985 births
Living people
Footballers from Algiers
Algerian footballers
Algeria under-23 international footballers
Algerian Ligue 2 players
JS Kabylie players
NA Hussein Dey players
MC Alger players
RC Kouba players
Algerian Ligue Professionnelle 1 players
Association football central defenders
21st-century Algerian people